Meriem Bjaoui is a Tunisian judoka. She is a two-time bronze medalist in the women's 63 kg event at the African Games, both in 2015 and 2019. She won the silver medal in the women's 63 kg event at the 2018 Mediterranean Games held in Tarragona, Spain.

She has also won medals at several editions of the African Judo Championships.

She won one of the bronze medals in the women's 63 kg event at the 2019 African Games held in Rabat, Morocco. At the 2021 African Judo Championships held in Dakar, Senegal, she won one of the bronze medals in her event.

References

External links 
 

Living people
Year of birth missing (living people)
Place of birth missing (living people)
Tunisian female judoka
Islamic Solidarity Games medalists in judo
Islamic Solidarity Games competitors for Tunisia
Mediterranean Games silver medalists for Tunisia
Mediterranean Games medalists in judo
Competitors at the 2018 Mediterranean Games
Competitors at the 2022 Mediterranean Games
African Games medalists in judo
African Games bronze medalists for Tunisia
Competitors at the 2015 African Games
Competitors at the 2019 African Games
21st-century Tunisian women